Solbjørnvatnet is a lake in Flakstad Municipality in Nordland county, Norway. The mountain Klokktinden lies on the southern shore of the lake.

See also
 List of lakes in Norway

References

Flakstad
Lakes of Nordland